Thero is an honorific term in Pali for senior bhikkhus (Buddhist monks)

It may also refer to:
 Thero (mythology), several figures in Greek mythology
 Thero Setsile (born 1995), Botswanan footballer
 Thero Wheeler (1945–2009), a founding member of the Symbionese Liberation Army left-wing terrorist organization
 Thero, Hooghly, a village in West Bengal, India

Masculine given names